The rusty-crowned babbler (Sterrhoptilus capitalis) is a species of bird in the family Zosteropidae. It is native to the southern Philippines.

Its natural habitat is subtropical or tropical moist lowland forest.

References

Collar, N. J. & Robson, C. 2007. Family Timaliidae (Babblers)  pp. 70 – 291 in; del Hoyo, J., Elliott, A. & Christie, D.A. eds. Handbook of the Birds of the World, Vol. 12. Picathartes to Tits and Chickadees. Lynx Edicions, Barcelona.

rusty-crowned babbler
Birds of Mindanao
rusty-crowned babbler
rusty-crowned babbler
Taxonomy articles created by Polbot